Juan Carlos Fernández can refer to:

 Juan Carlos Fernández (footballer) (born 1946)
 Juan Carlos Fernández (weightlifter) (born 1976)